The 1944-45 French Rugby Union Championship first division was played at Parc des Princes on April 7, 1945, before 30,000 spectators and won by Agen, who defeated Lourdes 7 - 3 in the final.

Coupe de France 

The "Coupe de France" was also won by Agen, again by defeating Lourdes in the final.

Semifinals

Finals 

1945
France 1944
Championship